Centralia is the debut studio album by the American band Car Bomb. This was the band's first full-length release, following a 2004 demo. It is also the band's only release through Relapse Records, which dropped the band four years later in 2011.
The album's title was named after the doomed town of Centralia, Pennsylvania, which was abandoned during an underground mine fire. The track's lyrical content and titles cover various topics - Cielo Drive (also known as 'Bloodbath Orgy') was named after the road on which one of the infamous Manson Family spree-killings were committed (10050 Cielo Drive), H5N1 is the medical abbreviation for the then-recent outbreak strain of Bird Flu, while 'M^6' covers neglect of a mother.

Reception
Critics praised the album's complex and ferocious rhythms. Keith Bergman, writing for Blabbermouth.net, argues in a highly positive 8/10 review that the album is "a lurching start-stop mélange of tempos that switch back and forth fast enough to give you whiplash, even more brutal for its lack of cohesion and unsettling, jittery rhythmic convulsions."

Track listing

Japanese release included the song 'Bra-c-ket'.

Personnel
Michael Dafferner – lead vocals
Elliot Hoffman – drums
Greg Kubacki – guitar
Jon Modell – bass

References 

2007 debut albums
Car Bomb (band) albums